Curraheen Park Greyhound Stadium is a greyhound racing track located in Bishopstown, west of Cork, County Cork, Ireland.

Racing takes place every Thursday, Friday and Saturday evening and the facilities include the grandstand Laurels restaurant, fast food facilities, a number of bars, totalisator betting and ample seating. 

Race distances are 330, 525, 550, 575, and 750 yards and the feature competitions at the track is the Laurels.

History 
Curraheen Park Greyhound Stadium is situated to the west of Cork on the Curraheen Road in Bishopstown. The track opened in the year 2000 as a replacement for the previous track the Cork (Western Road) Greyhound Stadium which is now the Western Gateway Building (science building of the University College Cork). The stadium is a third generation Cork Greyhound Stadium with the first two being The Show Grounds Greyhound Track (1928-1935) and then the previously mentioned Western Road stadium (1936-1996).  

The sale of the old track enabled the Bord na gCon to fund a new stadium with modern facilities).
The new stadium opened on 8 April 2000 costing IR£8.5 million and included a wonderful glass fronted grandstand as the centrepiece (the glass alone cost IR£400,000). The new track offered distances of 330, 525, 550, 575 & 700 yards and the long serving Noel Holland remained as the Racing Manager but would retire in 2004.
The Laurels remains the primary competition held at the track and since 2000 winners have included Sonic Flight, Ardkill Jamie and Razldazl Rioga.

Following the closure of Harolds Cross in 2017 the Grand National was brought to the track.

Competitions
Laurels
Grand National

Current track records

Former track records

References

Greyhound racing venues in the Republic of Ireland
Sports venues in County Cork
Sport in County Cork
Greyhound racing in Ireland